Maurice Rousseau (28 September 1906 – 22 August 1977) was a French artistic gymnast. He competed at the 1936 Summer Olympics and finished eighth with the French team. His best individual result was 32nd place on the rings.

References

1906 births
1977 deaths
Gymnasts at the 1936 Summer Olympics
Olympic gymnasts of France
Sportspeople from Nièvre
French male artistic gymnasts
20th-century French people